People with the surname Bednorz include:

Bartosz Bednorz (born 1994), Polish volleyball player
Filip Bednorz (1891–1954), Bishop of Katowice from 1952 to 1954
Herbert Bednorz (1908–1989), Bishop of Katowice from 1967 to 1985
Johannes Georg Bednorz (born 1950), a Nobel laureate in physics
Robert Bednorz (1882–1973), a German sculptor (:de:Robert Bednorz)

See also